The Friendly Islands Teachers' Association (FITA) is the only trade union of teachers in Tonga. It is affiliated with the International Trade Union Confederation and Education International. The union is incorporated, but not registered.

References

Trade unions in Tonga
International Trade Union Confederation
Education trade unions